The Six Nations Chiefs are Canadian Senior box lacrosse team from Six Nations of the Grand River.  The Chiefs play in the Major Series Lacrosse of the Ontario Lacrosse Association.  The Chiefs are six-time Mann Cup National Senior Champions.  Most recently, the Chiefs won the 2016 Mann Cup in five games against the Western Lacrosse Association's Maple Ridge Burrards.

History
The Chiefs won the Mann Cup Canadian National Senior Championship in 1994, 1995, 1996, 2013, 2014, and 2016.

Season-by-season results

See also
Six Nations Slash - Senior B
Six Nations Rivermen - Senior B
Six Nations Arrows - an affiliated Junior "A" box lacrosse team.
Six Nations Rebels - Junior B

External links
Official Six Nations Chiefs website

Ontario Lacrosse Association teams
Lacrosse of the Iroquois Confederacy
1993 establishments in Ontario
Lacrosse clubs established in 1993
Six Nations of the Grand River